Ilia Valeryevich Skirda (born 21 September 2002) is a Russian figure skater who competes in men's singles. He has won two silver medals on the ISU Junior Grand Prix series.

Career 
Skirda skated at Sokolniki Sports school before relocating to Sambo 70 skating club in 2013. He finished 7th at his first junior nationals, in 2015. After a year, he finished 4th at the 2016 Russian Junior Championships, behind Roman Savosin.

In August 2016, at age 13, Skirda made his international debut at the 2016–17 Junior Grand Prix (JGP) competition in Saint-Gervais-les-Bains, France. Ranked 9th in the short and first in the free skate, he won the silver medal behind Savosin. In his next event at the 2016 JGP Slovenia, Skirda won another silver medal after placing fourth in the short and second in the free skate with a total of 208.28 points. Skirda's results have qualified for his first 2016–17 JGP Final to be held in Marseilles, France.

Programs

Competitive highlights 
JGP: Junior Grand Prix

Detailed results

Junior level

References

External links 
 
 

2002 births
Russian male single skaters
Living people
Figure skaters from Moscow